James Marshall Hawkins (August 3, 1924 – October 28, 2010) was an American professional basketball player. Hawkins was selected in the 1948 BAA Draft by the Boston Celtics. He played for the Indianapolis Olympians in 1949–50, but prior to that he spent one season playing for the Oshkosh All-Stars in the National Basketball League.

Career statistics

NBA

Source

Regular season

Playoffs

References

1924 births
2010 deaths
American men's basketball players
United States Army Air Forces personnel of World War II
Basketball players from West Virginia
Boston Celtics draft picks
Forwards (basketball)
Indianapolis Olympians players
Oshkosh All-Stars players
Sportspeople from Huntington, West Virginia
Tennessee Volunteers basketball players
Tennessee Volunteers football players
Tennessee Volunteers men's tennis players
United States Army Air Forces officers